Álvaro Mejía Florez (15 May 1940 – 12 January 2021) was a long-distance runner from Colombia, who became a national hero after competing in the 1964 Tokyo Olympic Games 5,000 meter final.

Mejía competed in the 1968 Mexico City Olympics in the 10,000 meters, where he placed tenth, and in the 1972 Munich Olympics, where he ran the marathon.  Mejía also won the 1971 Boston Marathon in two hours, eighteen minutes and 45 seconds. He won a bronze medal at the 1971 Pan American Games in the 10,000 metres. Mejía won the Saint Silvester Road Race in 1966.

1971 Boston Marathon winner
In 1971, the 75th edition of the Boston Marathon had one of the closest finishes ever, as Mejía dueled almost the entire way with Pat McMahon, a native of Ireland and local Massachusetts resident. Mejía finally pulled away from McMahon less than 150 yards from the finish, clocking 2:18:45, just five seconds ahead of McMahon.  He was the first winner from South America.

Coming to America
Mejía was married to Terri Stickles, the American bronze medalist in the 400 meter freestyle swim in the 1964 Tokyo Olympic Games.  Stickles brought Mejía to the San Francisco Bay Area in 1969.  They met in Cali, Colombia, where Terri was a Peace Corps volunteer.

From 1969 until 1985, Mejía dispensed running advice along with running shoes and apparel at a sporting goods store ("Olympic Sports") he owned with Stickles in San Mateo, California.  During the 1970s, he competed as a member of the local West Valley Track Club (WVTC), at a time when the club often dominated team competition in Northern California.  Several Colombian runners followed Mejía to train in Northern California and compete alongside Mejia for WVTC, including Víctor Mora, who placed second in the 1972 Boston Marathon.  Mejia has one son, Christopher Mejia, born in 1971 (lives in San Francisco).

Achievements

Coaching
Mejía coached Colombian athletes including Alirio Carrasco, of Bogotá, who ran 2:12:09 at the Chicago Marathon in 2003.

Death
Mejía died in Bogotá on 12 January 2021 at the age of 80.

References

External links

BostonMarathon.org - 'Race Summaries', Boston Athletic Association
WestValleyTC.org - "A Confluence of Champions:  Mejia, Laris, Anderson, Dare, Clarke, Leydig Highlight WVTC Reunion", Chuck Schneekloth, West Valley Track Club

1940 births
2021 deaths
Colombian male long-distance runners
Athletes (track and field) at the 1964 Summer Olympics
Athletes (track and field) at the 1968 Summer Olympics
Athletes (track and field) at the 1972 Summer Olympics
Athletes (track and field) at the 1971 Pan American Games
Olympic athletes of Colombia
Pan American Games bronze medalists for Colombia
Pan American Games medalists in athletics (track and field)
Sportspeople from Medellín
Boston Marathon male winners
Central American and Caribbean Games gold medalists for Colombia
Competitors at the 1962 Central American and Caribbean Games
Competitors at the 1966 Central American and Caribbean Games
Central American and Caribbean Games medalists in athletics
Medalists at the 1971 Pan American Games
20th-century Colombian people